Rudolf Rieger (5 January 1916 – 13 March 1996) was an Austrian ski jumper. He competed in the individual event at the 1936 Winter Olympics.

References

1916 births
1996 deaths
Austrian male ski jumpers
Olympic ski jumpers of Austria
Ski jumpers at the 1936 Winter Olympics
People from Mödling District
Sportspeople from Lower Austria
20th-century Austrian people